The third World Masters Non-Stadia Athletics Championships were held in Bruges, Belgium. The World Masters Athletics Championships serve the division of the sport of athletics for people over 35 years of age, referred to as masters athletics.

References 

World Masters Athletics Championships
World Masters Athletics Championships
International athletics competitions hosted by Belgium
1996